The Six Ministries (Sino-Vietnamese: ,), or the Six Boards, were the major executive parts of the government of the Nguyễn period Vietnamese state from its establishment under the Gia Long Emperor in 1802 until 1906, with the establishment of the Học Bộ (chữ Hán: 學部) in 1907. These six core ministries would exist largely unchanged until the 1933 reforms of the Southern Court by the Bảo Đại Emperor.

History 
The Six Boards included: 
 Administration (部吏)
 Finance (部戸)
 Laws (部刑)
 Military Affairs (部兵)
 Public works (部工)
 Rites (部禮)

The Six Boards were established in 1802 after Gia Long's coronation, however they were not fully operational until 1830. Each board had a president, supported by two vice-presidents. In 1826 emperor Minh Mạng added two vice-minister into each board. By the mid-1840s, the six ministries comprised almost 100 people, included secretaries serving on their boards.
In 1907, emperor Duy Tân founded the Ministry of Education to take over a number of functions of the Board of Rites. Cao Xuân Dục was chosen to be its first minister.

Gallery

See also  
 Six Ministries of Joseon
 Three Departments and Six Ministries

References

Sources

  

 

Government of the Nguyễn dynasty